Mount Druitt railway station is located on the Main Western line, serving the Sydney suburb of Mount Druitt. It is served by Sydney Trains T1 Western line services.

History
The original Mount Druitt station opened on 19 August 1881. On 8 December 1974, a new station opened 500 metres to the east built, partly funded by the developer of the Westfield Shopping Centre.

In December 2003, an upgrade to the station including lifts and ramps was complete.

Platforms & services

Transport links

Mount Druitt Station Bus Interchange
Stand 1: Busways
756: to Blacktown via Powers Road and Doonside
757: to Marsden Park and Riverstone (peak hours only, connection at Plumpton via 756 required at all other times)
Stand 2: Busways
755: to Shalvey, extends to Plumpton during off-peak hours and on Saturdays
758: to St Marys via Shalvey and North St Marys
Stand 3: Busways
754: to Blacktown via Hassall Grove
Stand 4: Busways
750: to Blacktown via Carlisle Avenue and Richmond Road
761: to Bidwill via Carlisle Avenue
Stand 5: Busways
723: to Mount Druitt via Eastern Creek
728: to Blacktown via Rooty Hill and Bungarribee 
729: to Blacktown via Minchinbury and Eastern Creek
738: to Eastern Creek Industrial Park and Horsley Park
739V: to Mount Druitt Village loop
Stand 6: Busways
780: to Penrith via Whalan, Tregear, Ropes Crossing, Werrington County and Cambridge Park
Stand 7: Busways
674: to Windsor via Whalan, Tregear, Shanes Park, Berkshire Park and South Windsor
759: to St Marys via Emerton, Lethbridge Park, Tregear, Willmot, Ropes Crossing and North St Marys
Stand 8: Busways
770: to Penrith via Colyton, St Marys, Claremont Meadows and Kingswood
771: to St Marys via Colyton.
774: to Penrith via Oxley Park, St Marys, UWS Kingswood and Nepean Hospital
775: to Penrith via St Marys, UWS Kingswood and Nepean Hospital
776: to Penrith via St Clair, UWS Kingswood and Nepean Hospital

Mount Druitt station is served by one NightRide route:
N70: Penrith station to Town Hall station

References

External links

Mount Druitt station details Transport for New South Wales
Blacktown City Council – Photo of the original railway station
Blacktown City Council – Photo of the ceremony at commencement of electric services
Photos of original station Mount Druitt history

Easy Access railway stations in Sydney
Main Western railway line, New South Wales
Mount Druitt
Railway stations in Sydney
Railway stations in Australia opened in 1915